Simcha Bunim Alter (April 6, 1898 – August 6, 1992), also known as the Lev Simcha, after the works he authored, was the sixth Rebbe of the Hasidic dynasty of Ger, a position he held from 1977 until his passing.

In 1980, he instituted Yerushalmi Yomi, the daily learning of a page of the Jerusalem Talmud, similar to the renowned Daf Yomi for the Babylonian Talmud.

He died on July 7, 1992 (7th of Tammuz 5752), and was interred in the cave of the Gerrer Rebbes in the Mount of Olives cemetery.

References

1898 births
1992 deaths
Israeli Hasidic rabbis
Rebbes of Ger
Moetzes Gedolei HaTorah
Polish Hasidic rabbis
20th-century Polish rabbis
Burials at the Jewish cemetery on the Mount of Olives
People from Góra Kalwaria